The Śālistamba Sūtra (rice stalk or rice sapling sūtra) is an early Buddhist text that shows a few unique features which indicate a turn to the early Mahayana. It thus has been considered one of the first Mahayana sutras. According to N. Ross Reat, the sutra could date as far back as 200 BCE. It is possible that this sutra represents a period of Buddhist literature before the Mahayana had diverged significantly from the doctrine of the Early Buddhist schools.

Three commentaries on the sutra traditionally attributed to Nagarjuna also survive in Tibetan (Peking nos. 5466, 5485, 5486). There is also a commentary attributed to Kamalasila (eighth century).

Overview
While the Śālistamba does not survive fully in Sanskrit, it is the most widely quoted sutra in Mahayana texts on the topic of pratityasamutpada and thus about 90 percent of the material survives as various quotations in other Buddhist Sanskrit works. Therefore, the Sanskrit has been reconstructed by modern scholars (beginning with the work of Louis de La Vallée-Poussin, 1913). Many passages in this sutra have close parallels in the Pali suttas (especially the Mahatanha-sahkhaya Sutta, M1:256-71). The Salistamba also survives in six Chinese translations and in various Tibetan recensions, including some manuscripts from Dunhuang, and it is thus of great textual, historical and philological importance.

The Śālistamba Sūtra shows that its proto-Mahayana transmitters (possibly the Mahāsāṃghikas) knew and accepted a theory of dependent origination which is almost identical with that of the Pali canon. It also shows a intent to consolidate and systematize material that is found throughout the Pali Canon with a few new, albeit conservative innovations. For example, it applies a simile of seed and plants to the doctrine of dependent origination, something which is not found in the Pali canon. The core of the sutra is an "elaboration upon cause (hetu) in the subjective pratityasamutpada formula."

Mahayana elements in the sutra include the fact that it is said to be given by the Bodhisattva Maitreya and that it ends stating that whoever understands dependent arising will become a perfectly enlightened Buddha. The sutra is also a work focusing on the attainment of the Dharmakaya Buddha, stating "Whoever, monks, sees conditioned arising sees Dharma, and whoever sees Dharma sees the Buddha" (a combination of two well known statements in the Pali suttas). The sutra also seems to move closer to the Mahayana view that reality is illusory, using the term maya and also similes using reflections, which would become widely used to illustrate illusioriness in the Mahayana sutras.    

N. Ross Reat notes that this indicates that the early Mahayana tendency was not "self-consciously schismatic" but was simply one of the many attempts to systematize and elaborate on the Buddha's teachings. While some schools chose to incorporate these systematizations into Abhidharma texts, the proto-Mahayana chose to incorporate them into sutras.

There are three commentaries on the text:

 Śālistamba[ka]ṭīkā by Kamalashila
 Śālistamba[ka]mahāyanasūtra­ṭīkā attributed to a Nagarjuna
 Śālistambakakārikā attributed to a Nagarjuna

Translations and editions
Reat, N. Ross. The Śālistamba sūtra : Tibetan original, Sanskrit reconstruction, English translation, critical notes (including Pali parallels, Chinese version, and ancient Tibetan fragments). Delhi : Motilal Banarsidass Publishers, 1993.
Schoening, Jeffrey D. The Śālistamba Sūtra and Its Indian Commentaries

See also
Mahayana
Sanskrit Buddhist literature
Pre-sectarian Buddhism

Notes

External links
Xuanfa institute, translation by N. Ross Reat

Mahayana sutras